Maastricht is a city and a municipality in the southeastern Netherlands. It is the capital and largest city of the province of Limburg. Maastricht is located on both sides of the Meuse, at the point where the Jeker joins it. Mount Saint Peter (Sint-Pietersberg) is largely situated within the city's municipal borders. Maastricht is adjacent to the border with Belgium and is part of the Meuse-Rhine Euroregion, an international metropolis with a population of about 3.9 million, which includes the nearby German and Belgian cities of Aachen, Liège and Hasselt.

Maastricht developed from a Roman settlement (Trajectum ad Mosam) to a medieval river trade and religious centre. In the 16th century it became a garrison town and in the 19th century an early industrial centre. Today, the city is a thriving cultural and regional hub. It became well known through the Maastricht Treaty and as the birthplace of the euro. Maastricht has 1677 national heritage buildings (rijksmonumenten), the second highest number in the Netherlands, after Amsterdam. The city is visited by tourists for shopping and recreation, and has a large international student population.

History

Toponymy 
Maastricht is mentioned in ancient documents as [Ad] Treiectinsem [urbem] ab. 575, Treiectensis in 634, Triecto, Triectu in 7th century, Triiect in 768–781, Traiecto in 945, Masetrieth in 1051.

The place name Maastricht is an Old Dutch compound Masa- (> Maas "the Meuse river") + Old Dutch *treiekt, itself borrowed from Gallo-Romance *TRA(I)ECTU cf. its Walloon name li trek, from Classical Latin trajectus ("ford, passage, place to cross a river") with the later addition of Maas "Meuse" to avoid the confusion with the -trecht of Utrecht having exactly the same original form and etymology. The Latin name first appears in medieval documents and it is not known whether  was Maastricht's name during Roman times.

A resident of Maastricht is referred to as Maastrichtenaar whilst in the local dialect it is either Mestreechteneer or, colloquially, Sjeng (derived from the formerly popular French name Jean).

Early history 

Neanderthal remains have been found to the west of Maastricht (Belvédère excavations). Of a later date are Palaeolithic remains, between 8,000 and 25,000 years old. Celts lived here around 500 BC, at a spot where the river Meuse was shallow and therefore easy to cross.

It is not known when the Romans arrived in Maastricht, nor whether the settlement was founded by them. The Romans built a bridge across the Meuse in the 1st century AD, during the reign of Augustus Caesar. The bridge was an important link in the main road between Bavay and Cologne. Roman Maastricht was relatively small. Remains of the Roman road, the bridge, a religious shrine, a Roman bath, a granary, some houses and the 4th-century castrum walls and gates, have been excavated. Fragments of provincial Roman sculptures, as well as coins, jewelry, glass, pottery and other objects from Roman Maastricht are on display in the exhibition space of the city's public library (Centre Céramique).

According to legend, the Armenian-born Saint Servatius, Bishop of Tongeren, died in Maastricht in 384 where he was interred along the Roman road, outside the castrum. According to Gregory of Tours it was bishop Monulph who around 570 built the first stone church on the grave of Servatius, a precursor of the present-day Basilica of Saint Servatius. The city remained an early Christian diocese until it lost the distinction to nearby Liège in the 8th or 9th century.

Middle Ages 

In the early Middle Ages Maastricht, along with Aachen and Liège, formed part of what is considered the heartland of the Carolingian dynasty. At this time, the town was an important centre for river trade and manufacturing. Merovingian coins minted in Maastricht have been found throughout Europe. In 881 the town was plundered by the Vikings. In the 10th century it briefly became the capital of the duchy of Lower Lorraine.

During the 11th and 12th centuries the town flourished culturally. Several provosts of the chapter of Saint Servatius held important positions in the Holy Roman Empire. The two collegiate churches were largely rebuilt and redecorated during this era. Maastricht Romanesque stone sculpture and silversmithing are regarded as highlights of Mosan art. Maastricht painters were praised by Wolfram von Eschenbach in his Parzival. Around the same time, the poet Henric van Veldeke wrote a legend of Saint Servatius, one of the earliest works in Dutch literature. The two main churches acquired a wealth of relics and the septennial Maastricht Pilgrimage became a major event that drew up to 100,000 pilgrims.

Unlike most Dutch towns, Maastricht did not receive city rights at a certain date. These gradually developed during its long history. In 1204 the city's dual authority was formalised in a treaty, with the prince-bishop of Liège and the duke of Brabant holding joint sovereignty over the city. Soon afterwards the first ring of medieval walls were built. In 1275, the old Roman bridge collapsed under the weight of a procession, allegedly killing 400 people. A replacement bridge, funded by church indulgences, was built slightly to the north and survives until today, the Sint Servaasbrug.

Throughout the Middle Ages, the city remained a centre for trade and manufacturing principally of wool and leather but gradually economic decline set in. After a brief period of economic prosperity around 1500, the city's economy suffered during the wars of religion of the 16th and 17th centuries, and recovery did not happen until the industrial revolution in the early 19th century.

16th to 18th centuries 

The strategic location of Maastricht at a major river crossing necessitated the construction of an array of fortifications around the city during this period. The Spanish and Dutch garrisons became an important factor in the city's economy. In 1579 the city was sacked by the Spanish army led by the Duke of Parma (Siege of Maastricht, 1579). For over fifty years the Spanish crown took over the role previously held by the dukes of Brabant in the joint sovereignty over Maastricht. In 1632 the city was conquered by Prince Frederick Henry of Orange and the Dutch States General replaced the Spanish crown in the joint government of Maastricht.

Another Siege of Maastricht (1673) took place during the Franco-Dutch War. In June 1673, Louis XIV laid siege to the city because French supply lines were being threatened. During this siege, Vauban, the famous French military engineer, developed a new tactic in order to break down the strong fortifications surrounding Maastricht. His systematic approach remained the standard method of attacking fortresses until the 20th century. On 25 June 1673, while preparing to storm the city, captain-lieutenant Charles de Batz de Castelmore, also known as the comte d'Artagnan, was killed by a musket shot outside the Tongerse Poort. This event was embellished in Alexandre Dumas' novel The Vicomte de Bragelonne, part of the D'Artagnan Romances. French troops occupied Maastricht from 1673 to 1678.

In 1748 the French again conquered the city at what is known as the Second French Siege of Maastricht, during the War of Austrian Succession. After each siege the city's fortifications were restored and expanded. The French revolutionary army failed to take the city in 1793 but a year later they succeeded. The condominium was dissolved and Maastricht was annexed to the French First Republic, later the First French Empire. For almost twenty years (1795–1814/15) Maastricht was the capital of the French département of Meuse-Inférieure.

19th and early 20th century 

After the Napoleonic era, Maastricht became part of the United Kingdom of the Netherlands in 1815. It was made the capital of the newly formed Province of Limburg (1815–1839). When the southern provinces of the newly formed kingdom seceded in 1830, the Dutch garrison in Maastricht remained loyal to the Dutch king, William I, even when most of the inhabitants of the town and the surrounding area sided with the Belgian revolutionaries. In 1831, arbitration by the Great Powers allocated the city to the Netherlands. However, neither the Dutch nor the Belgians agreed to this and the arrangement was not implemented until the 1839 Treaty of London. During this period of isolation Maastricht developed into an early industrial town.

Because of its eccentric location in the southeastern Netherlands, as well as its geographical and cultural proximity to Belgium and Germany, integration of Maastricht and Limburg into the Netherlands did not come about easily. Maastricht retained a distinctly non-Dutch appearance during much of the 19th century and it was not until the First World War that the city was forced to look northwards.

Like the rest of the Netherlands, Maastricht remained neutral during World War I. However, being wedged between Germany and Belgium, it received large numbers of refugees, putting a strain on the city's resources. Early in World War II, the city was taken by the Germans by surprise during the Battle of Maastricht of May 1940. On 13 and 14 September 1944 it was the first Dutch city to be liberated by Allied forces of the US Old Hickory Division. The three Meuse bridges were destroyed or severely damaged during the war. As elsewhere in the Netherlands, the majority of Maastricht Jews died in Nazi concentration camps.

After World War II 

During the latter half of the century, traditional industries (such as Maastricht's potteries) declined and the city's economy shifted to a service economy. Maastricht University was founded in 1976. Several European institutions found their base in Maastricht. In 1981 and 1991 European Councils were held in Maastricht, the latter one resulting a year later in the signing of the Maastricht Treaty, leading to the creation of the European Union and the euro. Since 1988, The European Fine Art Fair, regarded as the world's leading art fair, annually draws in some of the wealthiest art collectors.

Since the 1990s, large parts of the city have been refurbished, including the areas around the main railway station and the Maasboulevard promenade along the Meuse, the Entre Deux and Mosae Forum shopping centres, as well as some of the main shopping streets. A prestigious quarter designed by international architects and including the new Bonnefanten Museum, a public library, and a theatre was built on the grounds of the former Société Céramique factory near the town centre. Further large-scale projects, such as the redevelopment of the area around the A2 motorway, the Sphinx Quarter and the Belvédère area are under construction.

In the early 2000s, Maastricht launched several campaigns against drug-dealing in an attempt to stop foreign buyers taking advantage of the liberal Dutch legislation and causing trouble in the downtown area.

Geography

Neighbourhoods 

Maastricht consists of seven areas (wijken) and 44 neighbourhoods (buurten). Each area and neighbourhood has a number which corresponds to its CBS code.

 Maastricht Centrum (CBS area code: 093500): Binnenstad, Jekerkwartier, Kommelkwartier, Statenkwartier, Boschstraatkwartier, Sint Maartenspoort, Wyck-Céramique
 South-West (093501): Villapark, Jekerdal, Biesland, Campagne, Wolder, Sint Pieter)
 West (093502): Brusselsepoort, Mariaberg, Belfort, Pottenberg, Malpertuis, Caberg, Malberg, Dousberg-Hazendans, Daalhof
 North-West (093503): Boschpoort, Bosscherveld, Frontenkwartier, Belvédère, Lanakerveld
 North-East (093505): Beatrixhaven, Borgharen, Itteren, Meerssenhoven
 East (093504): Wyckerpoort, Wittevrouwenveld, Nazareth, Limmel, Amby, Scharn, Heugemerveld
 South-East (093506): Randwyck, Heugem, Heer, De Heeg, Vroendaal

Itteren, Borgharen, Limmel, Amby, Heer, Heugem, Scharn, Oud-Caberg, Sint Pieter and Wolder are neighbourhoods that used to be separate municipalities or villages until they were annexed by the city of Maastricht in the course of the 20th century.

Neighbouring municipalities 
The outlying areas of the following municipalities are bordering the municipality of Maastricht directly.

Clockwise from north-east to north-west:

(B = Situated in Belgium)

Border 
Maastricht's city limits has an international border with Belgium. Most of it borders Belgium's Flemish region, but a small part to the south also has a border with Wallonia. Both countries are part of Europe's Schengen Area thus are open without border controls.

Climate 
Maastricht features the same climate as most of the Netherlands (Cfb, Oceanic climate), however, due to its more inland location in between hills, summers tend to be warmer (especially in the Meuse valley, which lies 70 metres lower than the meteorological station) and winters a bit colder, although the difference is only noticeable on just a few days a year.

Demographics

Historical population

Inhabitants by nationality

Inhabitants by country of birth

Languages 
Maastricht is a city of linguistic diversity, partly as a result of its location at the crossroads of multiple language areas and its international student population.

 Dutch is the national language and the language of elementary and secondary education (excluding international institutions) as well as administration. Dutch in Maastricht is often spoken with a distinctive Limburgish accent, which should not be confused with the Limburgish language.
 Limburgish (or Limburgian) is the overlapping term of the tonal dialects spoken in the Dutch and the Belgian provinces of Limburg. The Maastrichtian dialect (Mestreechs) is only one of many variants of Limburgish. It is characterised by stretched vowels and some French influence on its vocabulary. In recent years the Maastricht dialect has been in decline (see dialect levelling) and a language switch to Standard Dutch has been noted.
 French used to be the language of education and culture in Maastricht. In the late 18th century the language gained a powerful position as the judicial and administrative language, and throughout the following century it was the preferred language of the upper classes. Between 1851 and 1892 a Francophone newspaper (Le Courrier de la Meuse) was published in Maastricht. The language is often part of secondary school curricula. Many proper names are French and the language has left many traces in the local dialect.
 German, like French, is often part of secondary school curricula. Due to Maastricht's geographic proximity to Germany and the great number of German students in the city, German is widely spoken.
 English has become an important language in education. At Maastricht University and Hogeschool Zuyd it is the language of instruction for many courses. Many foreign students and expatriates use English as a lingua franca. English is also a mandatory subject in Dutch secondary schools.

Religion 
In 2010–2014, 69.8% of the population of Maastricht regarded themselves as religious. 60.4% of the total population stated an affiliation with the Roman Catholic Church. 13.9% attended a religious ceremony at least once a month.

Economy

Private companies based in Maastricht 
 Sappi – South African Pulp and Paper Industry
 Royal Mosa – ceramic tiles
 O-I Manufacturing – previously Kristalunie Maastricht; glass
 BASF – previously Ten Horn; pigments
 Mondi – packaging
 Rubber Resources/Elgi Rubber – previously Vredestein; rubber recycling
 Radium Foams – Talalay products
 Hewlett-Packard – previously Indigo, manufacturer of electronic data systems
 Vodafone – mobile phone company
 Q-Park – international operator of parking garages
 DHL – international express mail services
 Teleperformance – contact center services
 Mercedes-Benz – customer contact centre for Europe
 VGZ – health insurance, customer contact centre
 Pie Medical Imaging – cardiovascular quantitative analysis software
 Esaote (former Pie Medical Equipment) – manufacturer of medical and veterinary diagnostic equipment
 BioPartner Centre Maastricht – life sciences spin-off companies
 Medtronic – medical devices, R&D center

Public institutions 

Since the 1980s, a number of European and international institutions have made Maastricht their base. They provide an increasing number of employment opportunities for expats living in the Maastricht area.
 Administration of the Dutch province of Limburg
 Meuse-Rhine Euroregion
 Limburg Development Company LIOF
 RHCL and SHCL – archives of the province of Limburg
 Eurocontrol – The European Organisation for the Safety of Air Navigation
 European Journalism Centre
 European Institute of Public Administration (EIPA)
 European Centre for Development Policy Management (ECDPM)
 European centre for work and society (ECWS)
 Maastricht Centre for Transatlantic Studies (MCTS)
 Expert Centre for Sustainable Business and Development Cooperation (ECSAD)
 Council of European Municipalities and Regions (REGR)
 European Centre for Digital Communication (EC/DC)
 UNU-MERIT
 Maastricht Research School of Economics of TEchnology and ORganization (METEOR)
 Research Institute for Knowledge Systems (RIKS)
 Cicero Foundation (CF)

Culture and tourism

Sights of Maastricht 
Maastricht is known in the Netherlands and beyond for its lively squares, narrow streets, and historic buildings. The city has 1,677 national heritage buildings (rijksmonumenten), more than any Dutch city outside Amsterdam. In addition to that there are 3,500 locally listed buildings (gemeentelijke monumenten). The entire city centre is a conservation area (beschermd stadsgezicht) and largely traffic-free. The tourist information office (VVV) is located in the basement of Dinghuis, a late-medieval courthouse overlooking Grote Staat.
Maastricht's main sights include:
 Meuse river, with several parks and promenades along the river, and some interesting bridges:
 Sint Servaasbrug, partly from the 13th century; the oldest bridge in the Netherlands;
 Hoge Brug ("High Bridge"), a modern pedestrian bridge designed by René Greisch.
 City fortifications, including:
 Remnants of the first and second medieval city wall and several towers (13th and 14th centuries);
 Helpoort ("Hell's Gate"), an imposing gate with two towers, built around 1230, the oldest city gate in the Netherlands;
 Wycker Waterpoort, a medieval gate in Wyck, used for accessing the city from the Meuse, demolished in the 19th century but rebuilt shortly afterwards;
 Hoge Fronten (or: Linie van Du Moulin), remnants of 17th- and 18th-century fortifications, including a number of well-preserved bastions, couvrefaces, lunettes and dry moats;
 Fort Sint-Pieter, an early 18th-century fortress on the flanks of Mount Saint Peter, offering guided tours and panoramic views of the city; and Fort Willem I, an early 19th-century fortress on the Caberg elevation;
 Casemates, an underground network of tunnels, built as sheltered emplacements for guns and cannons. These connected tunnels built of brick and limestone run for around fourteen kilometres underneath the city's fortifications. Guided tours are available.
 Binnenstad: inner-city pedestrianized district with popular shopping streets Grote and Kleine Staat, high-end shopping streets Stokstraat and Maastrichter Smedenstraat, and two indoor shopping centres. Several main sights in Maastricht as well as a large number of cafés, pubs and restaurants are centred around the three main squares in Binnenstad:
 Vrijthof, the largest and possibly best-known square in Maastricht, with many well-known pubs and restaurants (including two - one former - gentlemen's clubs). Other sights include:
 Basilica of Saint Servatius, a predominantly Romanesque church with an imposing westwork and important 12th and 13th-century sculptures; most notably the westwork interior figurative capitals, the westwork reredo, and the sculpted South Portal. The tomb of Saint Servatius in the crypt is a favoured place of pilgrimage. The church has an important church treasury;
 Sint-Janskerk, a Gothic church dedicated to Saint John the Baptist, the city's main Protestant church since 1632, adjacent to the Basilica of Saint Servatius, with a distinctive limestone tower painted red;
 Spaans Gouvernement ("Spanish Government Building"), a 16th-century former canon's house, later used as a residence for the Brabant and Habsburg rulers, now housing the Fotomuseum aan het Vrijthof;
 Hoofdwacht, an 18th-century military guard house, built in the style of the Dutch Baroque, used for exhibitions;
 Generaalshuis ("General's House"), a Neoclassical mansion, now the city's main theater (Theater aan het Vrijthof).
 Onze Lieve Vrouweplein, a tree-lined square with a number of pavement cafes. Main sights:
 Basilica of Our Lady, a partly 11th-century church, one of the Netherlands' most significant Romanesque buildings with an imposing Mosan westwork and an important church treasury. Perhaps best known for the shrine of Our Lady, Star of the Sea in an adjacent Gothic chapel;
 Derlon Museumkelder, a permanent exhibition of ancient Roman remains in the basement of Hotel Derlon.
 Markt, the town's historic market square. Sights include:
 The Town Hall, built in the 17th century by Pieter Post and considered one of the highlights of Dutch Baroque architecture. Nearby is Dinghuis, the late medieval town hall and courthouse with an early Renaissance façade;
 Mosae Forum, a shopping centre and civic building designed by Jo Coenen and Bruno Albert in the early 2000s. Inside the Mosae Forum parking garage is a small exhibition of Citroën miniature cars;
 Entre Deux, a rebuilt shopping centre in Postmodern style, which has won several international awards. It includes a bookstore located inside a former 13th-century Dominican church. In 2008, British newspaper The Guardian proclaimed this the world's most beautiful bookshop.
 Jekerkwartier, a neighbourhood named after the small river Jeker, which pops up between old houses and remnants of city walls. The western part of the neighbourhood (named the Maastricht Latin Quarter) is dominated by university buildings and (performing) arts schools. Sights include:
 several churches and monasteries: the 13th-century First Franciscan Monastery, the 17th-century "Veiled Sisters" and Bonnefanten monasteries, and the 18th-century Second Franciscan Monastery and Walloon and Lutheran churches;
 Maastricht Natural History Museum, a small museum of natural history in a former monastery;
 Grote Looiersstraat ("Great Tanners' Street"), a former canal that was filled in during the 19th century, lined with elegant houses, the city's poorhouse (now part of the university library) and Sint-Maartenshofje, a typically Dutch hofje.
 Kommelkwartier, Statenkwartier and Boschstraatkwartier, three relatively quiet inner city neighbourhoods with several monasteries, university buildings and industrial heritage building:
 Crosier Monastery in Kommelkwartier, a well-preserved Gothic monastery, now a five-star hotel;
 Sint-Matthiaskerk, a 14th-century parish church dedicated to Saint Matthew;
 Sphinx Quarter, an upcoming neighbourhood and cultural hotspot in the north of the city centre. Several of the industrial buildings of the former Sphinx glass, crystal and ceramics factories have been transformed for new uses;
 Bassin, a restored early 19th-century inner harbor surrounded by industrial heritage buildings, re-used as cultural venues, bars and restaurants.
 Wyck, the old quarter on the right bank of the river Meuse.
 Saint Martin's Church, a Gothic Revival church designed by Pierre Cuypers in 1856;
 Rechtstraat and Hoogbrugstraat are the oldest streets in Wyck with many historic buildings and a mix of specialty shops, art galleries and restaurants;
 Stationsstraat and Wycker Brugstraat are elegant streets with the majority of the buildings dating from the late 19th century. At the east end of Stationsstraat stands the Maastricht railway station from 1913.
 Céramique, a modern neighbourhood on the site of the former Société Céramique potteries, including a park along the river Meuse (Charles Eyckpark) and a showcase of architectural highlights:
 Wiebengahal, one of the few remaining industrial buildings in the neighbourhood and an early example of modernist architecture in the Netherlands, dating from 1912;
 Bonnefanten Museum by Aldo Rossi, featuring a landmark rocket-shaped tower;
 Centre Céramique, a public library and exhibition space by Jo Coenen;
 La Fortezza, a red brick office and apartment building by Mario Botta;
 Siza Tower, a residential tower clad with zinc and white marble, by Álvaro Siza Vieira;
 Other buildings in Céramique by MBM, Cruz y Ortiz, Luigi Snozzi, Aurelio Galfetti, Herman Hertzberger, Wiel Arets, Hubert-Jan Henket, Charles Vandenhove and Bob Van Reeth.
It serves as Maastricht's main recreation area and a viewing point. The main sights include:
 Fort Sint-Pieter, an early 18th-century military fortress fully restored in recent years;
 Caves of Maastricht aka Grotten Sint-Pietersberg, an underground network of man-made tunnels ("caves") in limestone quarries. Guided tours are available;
 ENCI Quarry: a former quarry and nature reserve with several lakes, accessible via a spectacular staircase with viewing platforms;
 Slavante, a 19th-century former gentlemen's club on the site of a Franciscan monastery (of which parts are still standing), now a popular hang-out, offering panoramic views over the Meuse valley;
 Lichtenberg, a ruined medieval castle keep and an adjacent 18th-century farmstead;
 D'n Observant ("The Observer"), an artificial hilltop, made with the spoils of a nearby quarry, now a nature reserve.

Museums in Maastricht 
 Bonnefanten Museum is the foremost museum for old masters and contemporary fine art in the province of Limburg. The collection features medieval sculpture (The Virgin and Child with St. Anne), early Italian painting (Giovanni del Biondo, Domenico di Michelino, Jacopo del Casentino, Sano di Pietro, Pietro Nelli), Southern Netherlandish and German Renaissance painting (Colijn de Coter, Roelandt Savery, Pieter Coecke van Aelst, Pieter Brueghel the Younger, Lucas Cranach the Elder), and contemporary art (Sol LeWitt, Robert Mangold, Richard Serra, Luciano Fabro, Marcel Broodthaers, Joseph Beuys, Neo Rauch, Gilbert and George, Peter Doig, Gary Hume, Grayson Perry, Luc Tuymans, Ai Weiwei).
 The Treasury of the Basilica of Saint Servatius includes religious artifacts from the 4th to 20th centuries, notably those related to Saint Servatius. Highlights include the shrine, the key and the crosier of Saint Servatius, and the reliquary bust donated by Alexander Farnese, Duke of Parma.
 The Treasury of the Basilica of Our Lady contains religious art, textiles, reliquaries, liturgical vessels and other artifacts from the Middle Ages and later periods.
 Derlon Museumkelder is a preserved archeological site in the basement of a hotel with Roman and pre-Roman remains.
 The Maastricht Natural History Museum exhibits collections relating to the geology, paleontology and flora and fauna of Limburg. Highlights in the collection are several fragment of skeletons of Mosasaurs found in a quarry in Mount Saint Peter.
 Fotomuseum aan het Vrijthof is a local museum of photography housed in the 16th-century Spanish Government building, featuring some period rooms and temporary exhibitions of photographers.

Events and festivals 
 Dies natalis, birthday of the University of Maastricht, with procession of university faculty to St. John's Church where honorary degrees are awarded (9 January).
 Carnival (Maastrichtian: Vastelaovend) - a traditional three-day festival in the southern part of the Netherlands; in Maastricht mainly outdoors with typical Zaate Herremeniekes (February/March).
 The European Fine Art Fair (TEFAF), the world's leading art and antiques fair (March).
 Tattoo Expo Maastricht, an anunual international tattoo exhibition (March).
 Amstel Gold Race, an international cycling race which starts in Maastricht (usually April).
 KunstTour, an annual art festival (May).
 European Model United Nations (EuroMUN), an annual international conference (May).
 Stadsprocessie, religious procession with reliquaries of Saint Servatius and other local saints (first Sunday after 13 May).
 Pilgrimage of the Relics (Dutch: Heiligdomsvaart), pilgrimage with relics display and processions dating from the Middle Ages (May/June; once in 7 years; next: 2025).
 Giants' Parade (Dutch: Reuzenstoet), parade of processional giants, mainly from Belgium and France (June; once in 5 years; next: 2024).
 Maastrichts Mooiste, an annual running and walking event (June).
 Fashionclash, international fashion event throughout the city (June).
 Vrijthof concerts by André Rieu and the Johann Strauss Orchestra (July/August).
 Preuvenemint, a large culinary event held on the Vrijthof square (August).
 Inkom, the traditional opening of the academic year and introduction for new students of Maastricht University (August).
 Musica Sacra, a festival of religious (classical) music (September).
 Nederlandse Dansdagen (Netherlands Dance Days), a modern dance festival (October).
 Jazz Maastricht, a jazz festival formerly known as Jeker Jazz (autumn).
 11de van de 11de (the 11th of the 11th), the official start of the carnival season (11 November).
 Jumping Indoor Maastricht, an international concours hippique (showjumping) (November).
 Magic Maastricht (Magisch Maastricht), a winter-themed funfair and Christmas market held on Vrijthof square and other locations throughout the city (December/January).
Furthermore, the Maastricht Exposition and Congress Centre (MECC) hosts many events throughout the year.

Nature

Parks 
There are several city parks and recreational areas in Maastricht:
 Stadspark, the main public park in Maastricht, partly 19th-century, with remnants of the medieval city walls, a branch of the Jeker river, a mini-zoo and several public sculptures (e.g. the statue of d'Artagnan in Aldenhofpark, a 20th-century extension of Stadspark). Other extensions of the park are called Kempland, Henri Hermanspark, Monseigneur Nolenspark and Waldeckpark. From 2014 onwards, the grounds of the former Tapijn military barracks will be gradually added to the park;
 Jekerpark, a new park along the river Jeker, separated from Stadspark by a busy road;
 Frontenpark, a new park west of the city centre, incorporating parts of the fortifications of Maastricht from the 17th to 19th centuries;
 Charles Eykpark, a modern park between the public library and Bonnefanten Museum on the east bank of the Meuse river, designed in the late 1990s by Swedish landscape architect Gunnar Martinsson.
 Griendpark, a modern park on the east bank of the river with an inline-skating and skateboarding course.
 Geusseltpark in eastern Maastricht and J.J. van de Vennepark in western Maastricht, both with elaborate sports facilities.

Natural areas 
 The Meuse river and its green banks in outlying areas. In the northern areas around Itteren and Borgharen 'new nature' is being created in combination with river protection measures and gravel mining.
 Pietersplas, an artificial lake between Maastricht and Gronsveld that was the result of gravel pits on the banks of the Meuse river. There is a beach on the northern slope of the lake and a marina near Castle Hoogenweerth. The eastern riverbed between Pietersplas and the provincial government building is a nature reserve (Kleine Weerd).
 The Jeker Valley, along the river Jeker, starts near the city centre in Stadspark and leads via Jekerpark to an area with green meadows, fertile fields, some vineyards on the slopes of Cannerberg, several water mills and Château Neercanne, and continues further south into Belgium.
 The green flanks of Mount Saint Peter, including many footpaths. 
 Dousberg and Zouwdal, a modest hill and valley surrounded by urban development on the western edge of the city, partly in Belgium. A large part of the hill is now in use as an international golf course (Golfclub Maastricht).
 Landgoederenzone, an extended area in the northeast of Maastricht (partly in Meerssen) consisting of around fifteen country estates, such as Severen, Geusselt, Bethlehem, Mariënwaard, Kruisdonk, Vaeshartelt, Meerssenhoven, Borgharen and Hartelstein. Some of the castles, villas and stately homes are surrounded by industrial areas or quarries.
 Bike paths through agricultural areas in several outlying quarters (like "Biesland" and "Wolder").

Sports 

 In football, Maastricht is represented by MVV Maastricht (Dutch: Maatschappelijke Voetbal Vereniging Maastricht), who (as of the 2016–2017 season) play in the Dutch first division of the national competition (which is the second league after the Eredivisie league). MVV's home is the Geusselt stadium near the A2 highway.
 Maastricht is also home to the Maastricht Wildcats, an American Football League team and member of the AFBN (American Football Bond Nederland).
 Since 1998, Maastricht has been the traditional starting place of the annual Amstel Gold Race, the only Dutch cycling classic. For several years the race also finished in Maastricht, but since 2002 the finale has been in the municipality of Valkenburg. Tom Dumoulin was born in Maastricht.
 Since 2000, Maastricht has been the first city in the Netherlands with a Lacrosse team. The Student Sport Association "Maaslax" is closely linked to Maastricht University and a member of the NLB (Nederlandse Lacrosse Bond).

Politics

City council 

The municipal government of Maastricht consists of a city council, a mayor and a number of aldermen. The city council, a 39-member legislative body directly elected for four years, appoints the aldermen on the basis of a coalition agreement between two or more parties after each election. The 2006 municipal elections in the Netherlands were, as often, dominated by national politics and led to a shift from right to left throughout the country. In Maastricht, the traditional broad governing coalition of Christian Democrats (CDA), Labour (PvdA), Greens (GreenLeft) and Liberals (VVD) was replaced by a centre-left coalition of Labour, Christian Democrats and Greens. Two Labour aldermen were appointed, along with one Christian Democrat and one Green alderman. Due to internal disagreements, one of the VVD council members left the party in 2005 and formed a new liberal group in 2006 (Liberalen Maastricht). The other opposition parties in the current city council are the Socialist Party (SP), the Democrats (D66) and two local parties (Stadsbelangen Mestreech (SBM) and the Seniorenpartij).

Aldermen and mayors 
The aldermen and the mayor make up the executive branch of the municipal government. After the previous mayor, Gerd Leers (CDA), decided to step down in January 2010 following the 'Bulgarian Villa' affair, an affair concerning a holiday villa project in Byala, Bulgaria, in which the mayor was alleged to have been involved in shady deals to raise the value of villas he had ownership of. Up until 1 July 2015 the mayor of Maastricht was Onno Hoes, a Liberal (VVD), the only male mayor in the country, who officially was married to a male person. In 2013 Hoes was the subject of some political commotion, after facts had been disclosed about intimate affairs with several other male persons. The affair had no consequences for his political career. Because of a new affair in 2014 Hoes eventually stepped down.

Since 1 July 2015 the current mayor of Maastricht has been Annemarie Penn-te Strake. Penn is independent and serves no political party, although her husband is a former chairman of the Maastricht Seniorenpartij. She has served for the Dutch judicial system for many years in many different positions. During her tenure as mayor she still serves as attorney general.

Cannabis 
One controversial issue which has dominated Maastricht politics for many years and which has also affected national and international politics, is the city's approach to soft drugs. Under the pragmatic Dutch soft drug policy, a policy of non-enforcement, individuals may buy and use cannabis from 'coffeeshops' (cannabis bars) under certain conditions. Maastricht, like many other border towns, has seen a growing influx of 'drug tourists', mainly young people from Belgium, France and Germany, who provide a large amount of revenue for the coffeeshops (around 13) in the city centre. The city government, most notably ex-mayor Leers, have been actively promoting drug policy reform in order to deal with its negative side effects.

One of the proposals, known as the 'Coffee Corner Plan', proposed by then-mayor Leers and supported unanimously by the city council in 2008, was to relocate the coffeeshops from the city centre to the outskirts of the town (in some cases near the national Dutch-Belgian border). The purpose of this plan was to reduce the impact of drug tourism on the city centre, such as parking problems and the illegal sale of hard drugs in the vicinity of the coffeeshops, and to monitor the sale and use of cannabis more closely in areas away from the crowded city centre. The Coffee Corner Plan, however, has met with fierce opposition from neighbouring municipalities (some in Belgium) and from members of the Dutch and Belgian parliament. The plan has been the subject of various legal challenges and has not been carried out up to this date (2014).

On 16 December 2010, the Court of Justice of the European Union upheld a local Maastricht ban on the sale of cannabis to foreign tourists, restricting entrance to coffeeshops to residents of Maastricht. The ban did not affect scientific or medical usage. In 2011, the Dutch government introduced a similar national system, the wietpas ("cannabis pass"), restricting access to Dutch coffeeshops to residents of the Netherlands. After protests from local mayors about the difficulty of implementing the issuing of wietpasses, Dutch parliament in 2012 agreed to replace the pass by any proof of residency. The new system has led to a slight reduction in drug tourism to cannabis shops in Maastricht but at the same time to an increase of drug dealing on the street.

Transport

By car 
Maastricht is served by the A2 and A79 motorways. The city can be reached from Brussels and Cologne in approximately one hour and from Amsterdam in about two and a half hours.

The A2 motorway runs through Maastricht in a double-decked tunnel. Before 2016, the A2 motorway ran through the city; heavily congested, it caused air pollution in the urban area. Construction of a two-level tunnel designed to solve these problems started in 2011 and was opened (in stages) by December 2016.

In spite of several large underground car parks, parking in the city centre forms a major problem during weekends and bank holidays because of the large numbers of visitors. Parking fees are deliberately high to encourage visitors to use public transport or park and ride facilities away from the centre.

By train 
Maastricht is served by three rail operators, all of which call at the main Maastricht railway station near the centre and two of which call at the smaller Maastricht Randwyck, near the business and university district. Only Arriva also calls at Maastricht Noord, which opened in 2013. Intercity trains northwards to Amsterdam, Eindhoven, Den Bosch and Utrecht are operated by Dutch Railways. The line to Heerlen, Valkenburg and Kerkrade is operated by Arriva. The National Railway Company of Belgium runs south to Liège in Belgium. The westbound railway to Hasselt (Belgium) closed in 1954. The former railway to Aachen was closed down in the 1980s. However, Aachen can still be reached via Heerlen.

By bus 
Regular bus lines connect the city centre, outer areas, business districts and railway stations. The regional Arriva bus network extends to most parts of South Limburg and Aachen (Germany). Regional buses by De Lijn connect Maastricht with Hasselt, Tongeren and Maasmechelen, and one bus connects Maastricht with Liège, operated by TEC. Various bus companies such as Flixbus and Eurolines provide intercity bus services from Maastricht to many European destinations.

By air 
Maastricht is served by the nearby Maastricht Aachen Airport , in nearby Beek, and it is informally referred to by that name. The airport is served by Corendon Dutch Airlines and Ryanair which operate scheduled flights to destinations around the Mediterranean, the Canary Islands, North-Africa and also London Stansted Airport from March 2022. There are also charter flights to Lourdes which are operated by Enter Air.

By boat 
Maastricht has a river port (Beatrixhaven) and is connected by water with Belgium and the rest of the Netherlands through the river Meuse, the Juliana Canal, the Albert Canal and the Zuid-Willemsvaart. Although there are no regular boat connections to other cities, various organized boat trips for tourists connect Maastricht with Belgium cities such as Liège.

Distances to other cities 
These distances are as the crow flies and so do not represent actual overland distances.

Education

Secondary education 
 Bernard Lievegoedschool (Anthroposophical education)
 Bonnefantencollege
 Porta Mosana College
 Sint-Maartenscollege
 United World College Maastricht

Tertiary education 
 Maastricht University (Dutch: Universiteit Maastricht or UM) including:
 University College Maastricht
 Maastricht School of Management (merged with UM in 2022)
 Zuyd University of Applied Sciences (Dutch: Hogeschool Zuyd, also has departments in Sittard and Heerlen) including:
 Academy for Dramatic Arts Maastricht (Dutch: Toneelacademie Maastricht)
 School of Fine Arts Maastricht (Dutch: Academie Beeldende Kunsten Maastricht)
 Maastricht Academy of Music (Dutch: Conservatorium Maastricht)
 Academy of architecture
 Faculty of International Business and Communication
 Maastricht Hotel Management School
 Teikyo University (Maastricht campus closed in 2007)

Other 
 Jan Van Eyck Academie - post-academic art institute
 Berlitz Language School Maastricht
 Talenacademie Nederland

International relations

Twin towns 
Maastricht is twinned with:

Notable people

Born in Maastricht 
 Jean-Eugène-Charles Alberti (1777 – after 1843) – painter
 Henri Arends (1921–1993) – conductor
 Doris Baaten (born 1956) – voice actress
 Gerard Bergholtz (born 1939) – footballer
 Mieke de Boer (born 1980) – female darts player
 Alphons Boosten (1893–1951) – architect
 Theo Bovens (born 1959) – politician
 Joseph Bruyère (born 1948) – Belgian cyclist
 Jeu van Bun (1918–2002) – footballer
 Jean-Baptiste Coclers (1696–1772) – painter
 Louis Bernard Coclers (1740–1817) – painter
 Peter Debye (1884–1966) – Nobel prize winning chemist
 Tom Dumoulin (born 1990) – cyclist, Giro d'Italia winner
 Robin Frijns (born 1991) - Racing Driver
 Hendrick Fromantiou (1633/4 – after 1693) – still life painter
 Joop Haex (1911–2002) – politician
 André Henri Constant van Hasselt (1806–1874) – French-writing poet
 Hubert Hermans (born 1937) – psychologist and creator of Dialogical Self Theory
 Pieter van den Hoogenband (born 1978) – swimmer and a triple Olympic champion
 Pierre Kemp (1886–1967) – poet
 Sjeng Kerbusch (1947–1991) – behavior geneticist
 Mathieu Kessels (1784–1836) – sculptor
 Lambert of Maastricht (c. 636 – c. 705) – bishop, saint
 Marie-Louise Linssen-Vaessen (1928–1993) – freestyle swimmer
 Eric van der Luer (born 1965) – footballer, football manager
 Pierre Lyonnet (1708–1789) – naturalist, cryptographer, engraver
 Félix de Mérode (1791–1857) – politician, writer
 David de Meyne (1569 – 1620) – painter and cartographer
 Andreas Victor Michiels (1797–1849) – military and administrative officer in the Dutch East Indies
 Jan Pieter Minckeleers (1748–1824) – scientist and inventor of coal gas lighting
 Bram Moszkowicz (born 1960) – ex-barrister
 Benny Neyman (1951–2008) – singer of popular songs
 Tom Nijssen (born 1964) – tennis player
 Jacques Ogg (born 1948) – harpsichordist
 Henrietta d'Oultremont (1792–1864) – second wife of William I of the Netherlands
 Jan Peumans (born 1951) – Belgian politician
 Guido Pieters (born 1948) – film director
 Dick Raaymakers (1930–2013) – composer, theater maker
 Prince Rajcomar (born 1985) – football player
 Louis Regout (1861–1915) – politician
 André Rieu (born 1949) – violinist, conductor and composer
 Fred Rompelberg (born 1945) – cyclist, former world record holder
 Louis Rutten (1884-1946) – Dutch geologist
 Henri Sarolea  (1844–1900) – railway entrepreneur and contractor
 Bryan Smeets (born 1992) - football player
 Hubert Soudant (born 1946) – conductor
 Victor de Stuers (1843–1916) – politician, monument conservationist
 Jac. P. Thijsse (1865–1945) – botanist, conservationist
 Germaine Thyssens-Valentin (1902–1987) – pianist
 Ad van Tiggelen (born 1958) - fantasy writer Adrian Stone
 Frans Timmermans (born 1961) – politician
 Johann Friedrich August Tischbein (1750–1812) – portrait painter
 Maxime Verhagen (born 1956) – politician
 Carel de Vogelaer (1653–1695) – painter
 Hubert Vos (1855–1935) – painter
 Ad Wijnands (born 1959) – cyclist, Tour de France stage winner
 Jeroen Willems (1962–2012) – actor, singer
 Henri Winkelman (1876–1952) – general
 Danny Wintjens (born 1983) – football goalkeeper
 Boudewijn Zenden (born 1976) – football player
 Kim Zwarts (born 1955) – photographer

Residing in Maastricht 

 Jo Bonfrere (born 1946) – football player
 Willy Brokamp (born 1946) – football player
 Jeroen Brouwers (born 1940) – writer, journalist
 Gondulph of Maastricht (c. 524 – c. 607) – bishop, saint
 Theo Hiddema (born 1944) – lawyer
 Willem Hofhuizen (1915–1986) – painter
 Monulph of Maastricht (6th century) – bishop, saint
 Max Moszkowicz (born 1926) – lawyer
 Servatius of Maastricht (4th century – 384?) – bishop, saint
 Jan van Steffeswert (15th/16th century) – sculptor, wood carver
 Aert van Tricht (15th/16th century) – metal caster
 Henric van Veldeke (12th century) – poet, hagiographer

Local anthem 
In 2002 the municipal government officially adopted a local anthem (Limburgish (Maastrichtian variant): Mestreechs Volksleed) composed of lyrics in Maastrichtian. The theme was originally written by Ciprian Porumbescu (1853–1883).

Gallery

See also 
 Jewish inhabitants of Maastricht
 Maastricht Treaty
 Treaty of Maastricht (1843)
 The Maastrichtian Age, which marks the end of the Cretaceous Period and Mesozoic Era of geological time

References 
Notes

Literature

Bibliography

External links

Maastricht city portal
Maastricht municipality website
Maastricht in Roman times 
Webpage about Maastricht fortifications 
Webpage about the 1673 siege 
Maastricht tourism website

 
Belgium–Netherlands border crossings
Cities in the Netherlands
Municipalities of Limburg (Netherlands)
Populated places in Limburg (Netherlands)
Provincial capitals of the Netherlands
Roman sites in the Netherlands
South Limburg (Netherlands)
Vauban fortifications